Ernest Kavanagh (1884 – 25 April 1916) was a Dublin born cartoonist who contributed to a number of political publications in the early part of the 20th century.

Biography

Kavanagh's cartoons were published using his initials E.K. He provided cartoons for The Irish Worker newspaper of James Larkin's  Irish Transport and General Workers' Union.  He produced cartoons published alongside poems by his sister the writer and poet Maeve Cavanagh McDowell. 

As well as supporting the working class his cartoons attacked the recruitment drive for World War One and supported the suffragette movement. He contributed cartoons to the suffragette paper, The Irish Citizen, Fianna and Irish Freedom. A non-combatant, he was struck and killed by a bullet during the Easter Rising, on 25 April 1916.

A book on his cartoons, Artist of the Revolution. The Cartoons of Ernest Kavanagh,  was published in 2012.

References

External links

  Francis Devine on William Martin Murphy

1884 births
1916 deaths
Irish cartoonists
People of the Easter Rising
Civilian casualties